Kudgi  is a village in the southern state of Karnataka, India. It is located in the Basavana Bagevadi taluk of Bijapur district in Karnataka. NTPC has set up a power plant of 4000 MW capacity here(3×800MW in first stage and 2×800MW in second stage).

Demographics
 India census, Kudgi had a population of 6108 with 3193 males and 2915 females.

See also
 Bijapur district
 Districts of Karnataka

References

External links
 http://Bijapur.nic.in/

Villages in Bijapur district, Karnataka